Sidi Bellater or Sidi Belattar is a town and commune in Mostaganem Province, Algeria. It is located in Aïn Tédelès District. According to the 1998 census it has a population of 6,670.

History
The town was a colony of the Roman empire, called Quiza Xenitana.

References

Communes of Mostaganem Province